was a Japanese Rinzai master, poet, flute player, and first abbot of Eigen-ji (constructed solely for him to teach Zen). His poetry is considered to be among the finest of Zen poetry. He traveled to China and studied Ch'an with masters of the Linji school from 1320 to 1326, then returned to Japan and lived for many years as a hermit. It was only toward the end of his life that he decided to teach Zen to others.

See also
Buddhism in Japan
List of Rinzai Buddhists

Notes

References

Further reading

1290 births
1367 deaths
13th-century Japanese people
14th-century Japanese poets
Rinzai Buddhists
Zen Buddhism writers
Zen Buddhist monks
Japanese Zen Buddhists
Kamakura period Buddhist clergy
People from Kamakura